Ryan Groy (born September 30, 1990) is an American football center who is a free agent. He was signed as an undrafted free agent by the Chicago Bears in 2014. He played college football at Wisconsin.

College career
Groy is a Wisconsin native. He redshirted for the Badgers in 2009, and set a school record by playing all 54 games of his career. He played 13 games in 2010, starting two at fullback. In 2011, he played 14 games, starting four (three at left guard, one at center). He started all 14 games in 2012 (12 at left guard, two at left tackle), and all 13 games at left guard in 2013.

Professional career

Chicago Bears
Groy was signed as an undrafted free agent to the Chicago Bears on May 11, 2014. He was then moved to the practice squad on September 1. On November 10, he was promoted to the active roster.

New England Patriots
On August 10, 2015, Groy was traded to the New England Patriots for Matthew Wells. On September 4, 2015, Groy was waived by the Patriots with an injury designation.

Tampa Bay Buccaneers
On October 28, 2015, Groy was signed to the Buccaneers' practice squad.

Buffalo Bills
On November 25, 2015 Groy was signed by Buffalo Bills off the Buccaneers' practice squad. He started multiple games at center in relief of an injured Eric Wood at the end of the 2016 season.

Set to be a restricted free agent in 2017, the Bills placed an original round tender on Groy. The Los Angeles Rams signed him to a two-year offer sheet on March 14, 2017, giving the Bills five days to match the offer or lose him to the Rams. On March 17, 2017, the Bills matched the Rams' offer, keeping him with the Bills under a two-year contract.

In 2018, Groy was named the Bills' starting center to begin the season following the retirement of Eric Wood and beating out veteran Russell Bodine. He started the first two games before being benched for Week 3 in favor of Bodine. He was re-named the starter in Week 14 following a season-ending injury to Bodine.

New Orleans Saints
On May 22, 2019, Groy was signed by the New Orleans Saints. He was released during final roster cuts on August 30, 2019.

Los Angeles Chargers
On October 9, 2019, Groy was signed by the Los Angeles Chargers.

Groy re-signed with the Chargers on May 20, 2020. He was released on September 5, 2020, and signed to the practice squad the next day. He was elevated to the active roster on September 12 for the team's week 1 game against the Cincinnati Bengals, and reverted to the practice squad a day after the game. He was promoted to the active roster on September 26, 2020. He started three games at right guard in place of an injured Trai Turner before being placed on injured reserve on October 29, 2020, while also testing positive for COVID-19. He was moved back to injured reserve from the COVID-19 list on December 30.

References

1990 births
Living people
People from Middleton, Wisconsin
Players of American football from Wisconsin
American football centers
American football offensive guards
Wisconsin Badgers football players
Chicago Bears players
New England Patriots players
Tampa Bay Buccaneers players
Buffalo Bills players
New Orleans Saints players
Los Angeles Chargers players